

Lake Pampulha (Portuguese: Lagoa da Pampulha) is an artificial lake located in Pampulha, Belo Horizonte, Brazil. It is also the name of an administrative region (região administrativa) of Belo Horizonte, and the name of one of 29 neighborhoods (bairros) within the administrative region of the same name. The lake was built in the early 1940s during the mayoralty of Juscelino Kubitschek, later president of Brazil from 1956 to 1961. Pampulha was created as a source of water for the city of Belo Horizonte, but quickly became polluted.

The lake is fed by 8 small streams, the largest being the Sarandi and Ressaca. 424,000 residents live in the catchment area of the lake.

Landmarks

Many of Belo Horizonte's cultural landmarks are located around or close to the lake, including the Federal University of Minas Gerais, the soccer stadium Mineirão, the Mineirinho Arena, the Church of Saint Francis of Assisi, the Iate Tênis Clube and the Museum of Modern Art (the latter three designed by Oscar Niemeyer).

Kubitschek called on the architect Oscar Niemeyer to design a series of buildings around Lake Pampulha in 1941. These include the Church of Saint Francis of Assisi, the Art Museum, the Casa de Baile ("house of dance", in a loose translation) and the Tennis Club. The Burle Marx gardens, paintings by Portinari and sculptures by Ceschiatti, Zamoiski and José Pedrosa complete and enhance the project conceived for the lake. The group of buildings and artwork became a reference point for the development of modern Brazilian art and architecture. In July 2016 the buildings designed by Niemeyer were named a UNESCO World Heritage site. Today these buildings offer visitors the chance to see the 'birth' of modernism in Brazil, as Neimeyer's concepts and use of reinforced, curved concrete became a hallmark of the modernist movement around the world.

By the side of the lake are a number of leisure facilities such as the Governor Magalhães Pinto Stadium (better known as "Mineirão"), the Mineirinho gymnasium, the Botanical Gardens, the Zoo, the Ecological Park, the Equestrian Centre and tracks for cycling and walking.

Environmental conditions
Lake Pampulha suffers from pollution due to rapid urbanization of the catchment area, the discharge of untreated sewage from the surrounding neighborhoods in Belo Horizonte, and unabated erosion in many points of the drainage basin. Cyanobacterial blooms are a frequent occurrence.

In February 2020, a new amoebic virus named "Yaravirus" was found in the waters of Lake Pampulha, with genes that had never been seen before in any life-form and may be a member of or at least related to NCLDV giant viruses (aka Nucleocyroviricota). This finding was preceded by a former one of "Niemeyer virus", a species of genus Mimivirus (NCLDV) in 2014
along with two isolates of "Pandoravirus" (NCLDV also) taken from two of the creeks feeding the lake: "P. pampulha from   creek and "Pandoravirus tropicalis" from  creek (2019). As these are viruses with unicellular amoeboid hosts and therefore are not known to be harmful for humans.

References

Neighbourhoods in Belo Horizonte
Oscar Niemeyer buildings
Pampulha
Landforms of Minas Gerais